Sandy River Valley Sign Language was a village sign language of the 19th-century Sandy River Valley in Maine. Together with the more famous Martha's Vineyard Sign Language and Henniker Sign Language, it was one of three local languages which formed the basis of American Sign Language.

The deaf communities in the valley developed in some of the 30 villages founded by settlers from Martha's Vineyard. However, it is not clear whether MVSL itself was transmitted, or if the chain was broken and a new sign language was created once a substantial deaf population was established.

References
Lane, Pillard, & French, "Origins of the American Deaf-World: Assimilating and Differentiating Societies and Their Relation to Genetic Patterning". In Emmorey & Lane, eds, The Signs of Language Revisited, 2000

Village sign languages
Languages attested from the 19th century
Languages extinct in the 19th century
Sign languages of the United States
Extinct sign languages